The TCR Middle East Touring Car Series is a touring car racing series based in the Middle East.

History
On 15 November 2016, WSC announced that the creation of the TCR Middle East Series. The series was officially launched on 2 December 2016 at the Bahrain International Circuit, where a media and test day were held. The series visits the Dubai Autodrome, Yas Marina Circuit and the Bahrain International Circuit.

Relaunch
In August 2022, the TCR Middle East Series was relaunched by WSC in cooperation with its new promoter, Driving Force Events. A 2022-2023 schedule was published and included two pairs of back-to-back events at Yas Marina Circuit, the Bahrain International Circuit and the Dubai Autodrome, plus another event at a yet-to-be-confirmed venue. Unlike previous iterations of the TCR Middle East Series, the relaunched championship will feature hour-long races with mandatory driver changes as well as some night races.

2017 Results

2018 Results

2019 Results

References 

TCR Series
2016 establishments in Asia
Recurring sporting events established in 2016